The Bentley 4 Litre was a motor car built on rolling chassis made by Bentley Motors Limited. The 4 litre chassis was conceived and built in a failed attempt to restore Bentley to a good financial state.  Announced 15 May 1931, it used a modified four litre Ricardo IOE engine in a shortened 8 litre chassis at two-thirds of the price of the 8 Litre in an attempt to compete with the Rolls-Royce 20/25.  Instead, Bentley went into receivership shortly afterward, from which it was purchased by Rolls-Royce Limited.

The engine power was not suitable for the heavy chassis.

References

4
1930s cars